William George Hardie, CBE, (20 August 1878 – 21 February 1950) was a long serving Anglican Bishop of Jamaica from 1931 until 1949; and for the last four of that time Archbishop of the West Indies.

He was born in 1878 and educated at Highgate School from 1889 to 1890, then at Giggleswick School and Emmanuel College, Cambridge. From Ridley Hall, Cambridge he was ordained in 1902. His first posts were curacies at Holy Trinity Church, Cambridge and then Christ Church, Greenwich. Later he held incumbencies at Holy Trinity, Swansea, St John's, Lowestoft and St Luke's, Finchley. In 1928 he was appointed Assistant Bishop of Jamaica before promotion to be its Diocesan three years later. He was invested Commander of the Order of the British Empire (CBE) in the 1950 New Year Honours.

He died on 21 February 1950.

Notes

External links

1878 births
People educated at Highgate School
People educated at Giggleswick School
Alumni of Emmanuel College, Cambridge
20th-century Anglican bishops in the Caribbean
Anglican bishops of Jamaica
Anglican archbishops of the West Indies
20th-century Anglican archbishops
Commanders of the Order of the British Empire
1950 deaths